Balve is a town in the Märkischer Kreis district, North Rhine-Westphalia, Germany. It is located in Hönnetal, a narrow valley created by the river Hönne, which is near the Sorpe Dam, formerly part of Balve, and at the north end of the Sauerland, near Dortmund. The town was established in 1975 with several divisions including Balve, Beckum and Eisborn and Garbeck.

History 

The first reference to Balve is from around 780, when it was mentioned that a Widukind owned a farm called Ballowa, another name for the town, although this reference has been disputed. The first undisputed reference was in 864, in which a blind girl from Balve was said to be healed at the grave of the Saint Ludger in the crypt of Werden Abbey.

Ballowa is also mentioned in the Thidrekssaga, a chivalric saga written in the mid-13th century in Norway. In the saga, Ballowa is the home of two dwarfs who taught Weyland much about making iron weapons. At the time of writing, Balve belonged to the county of Arnsberg.

In 1358 the town became the property of the Duchy of Westphalia, which belonged to the Archbishops of Cologne. In 1430 it was given the right to be called a city. During the Napoleonic period, it belonged for a short time (1802–1815) to Hesse, after which time it became part of the Kingdom of Prussia.

In 1975, following a substantial reorganisation of local government in Germany, the city was enlarged by the addition of the several former independent municipalities from the abolished Amt Balve, including Asbeck, Beckum, and Eisborn.

Organizations, economy and transportation

Local organizations include a Red Cross chapter, and the Schützenbruderschaft St. Sebastian Balve, founded in 1947. Primary schools in the town include Grundschule Balve and Grundschule Beckum. Several international companies have roots in the town, including Balver Zinn, Chemie Wocklum, and Kruse Group.

Train stations in Balve include Binolen, Volkringhausen, Sanssouci, Garbeck and Balve, the latter station part of the  Hönnetalbahn (RB 54) line.

Religion

The main religion in Balve is Roman Catholicism. The church Saint Blaise, built in the 12th century and an example of Romanesque architecture, was consecrated to Mary. On February 3 each year a special ceremony is held in the church, called the Blessing of the Throats. The altar servers of Saint Blaise visit other cities every year, for example Georgsmarienhütte in 1982. Bones from Benedict of Nursia and Saint Blaise, and a 400-year-old monument for Hermann von Hatzfeld, are located in the church. Additionally, two Roman Catholic parishes have been present in Balve for several years.

A Lutheran church is located at Hönnetalstrasse near to the Gemeindezentrum.

Culture

Performing arts

The Männerchor 1860 Balve is the largest choir in Balve. Other choirs include the Männerchor Garbeck and MC Cäcilia Volkringhausen. The town's bands include Musikverein Balve and Musikverein Garbeck.

Until 2005, the organization Festpiele Balver Höhle and the town of Balve have jointly hosted a jazz festival. Acts at the festival have included performances by Jan Garbarek and by Piirpauke. One of the theatre ensembles in Balve is the Kolpingtheatergruppe, directed by Christoph Rapp. Another form of entertainment, the Balver Märchenwochen, involves performing fairy tales at Christmas.

Festivals

The Festspiele Balver Höhle is held at the Balver Höhle, a cave in Balve. The festival is a major focus of the culture in and around the town, featuring music and theatre performances. The only marksmen's festival, Schützenfest, is also held in a cave, and is organized by Schützenbruderschaft St. Sebastian.

A large bonfire on Easter Sunday is another tradition in Balve, organized by the Kolpingsfamilie Balve. On May 1 each year the fire brigade of Balve is invited to the Feuerwehrfest, and for 20 years a christmas market has organized by Balver Fachhandel that features a live nativity scene.

Sports
One of the soccer clubs in Balve, SG Balve/Garbeck, won the DFB-Ü 40-Cup in 2007. The town also organizes the Balve Optimum, a competition between horse riders.

Participiants in the Balve Optimum have included:
Horse jumping
Reiner Klimke
Paul Schockemöhle
Ludger Beerbaum
Markus Beerbaum
Jessica Kürten (2007)
Hugo Simon (2008)
Meredith Michaels-Beerbaum (2008)
Eva Bitter (2008)
Dressage
Isabell Werth (2008)
Matthias Alexander Rath (2008)

Points of interest

There are many caves in the Hönnetal, including the Balver Höhle at Helle, a large cave used for cultural events such as concerts, stage acting and the annual marksmen's festival, and the Reckenhöhle, a cave 1,478 ft in length that has flowstone. Experts have found signs of cannibalism in some of the caves.

Other points of interest include 
 The walls of an old Germanic farm, located Garbeck,
 Beckum, where scientists found bones from eight kind of species of dinosaurs from the cretaceous, and
 The Luisenhütte, the only surviving 18th-century blast furnace that is still in workable condition, situated close to the 14th-century castle Schloss Wocklum, the home of Count Dieter von Landsberg-Velen.

Coat of arms
The town's coat of arms references the history of Balve. The eagle is taken from the arms of Arnsberg, and the black-and-white cross from that of Cologne. Both symbols were present in old seals of the city, of which the oldest known example dates from 1462. The coat of arms was officially granted on June 24, 1911, and confirmed on February 6, 1976, after the local government reorganization of 1975.

The bottom part of the coat of arms of the former Amt Balve is identical Bolve's town arms. The top half showed St. Peter, wearing a red coat and holding in his left hand a golden key and in his right a golden book. This coat of arms was granted on March 5, 1957, and expired when the Amt was dissolved in 1975.

Persons of interest 
 Jean-Marc Gaulin (1962–), Canadian ice hockey player born in Balve
 Franz Hoffmeister (1898–1943), Roman Catholic priest
 Theodor Pröpper (1896–1979), composer and church musician
 Hermann Wedekind (1910–1998), actor, opera singer and theatre director

References

External links

Official site 

 
Märkischer Kreis
Members of the Hanseatic League